
Czarnków-Trzcianka County is a unit of territorial administration and local government (powiat) in Greater Poland Voivodeship, west-central Poland. It came into being on January 1, 1999, as a result of the Polish local government reforms passed in 1998.

As of 2006 its total population is 86,134, out of which the population of Trzcianka is 16,756, that of Czarnków is 11,356, that of Krzyż Wielkopolski is 6,283, that of Wieleń is 5,940, and the rural population is 45,799.

Neighbouring counties
Czarnków-Trzcianka County is bordered by Wałcz County and Piła County to the north, Chodzież County to the east, Oborniki County and Szamotuły County to the south, Międzychód County to the south-west, and Strzelce-Drezdenko County to the west.

Administrative division
The county is subdivided into eight gminas (one urban, three urban-rural and four rural). These are listed in the following table, in descending order of population.

References
Polish official population figures 2006

 
Land counties of Greater Poland Voivodeship